Princess Emmy is a 2019 German-British-Belgian animated fantasy film directed by Piet de Rycker from a screenplay by Sergio Casci. A co-production between Studio 100 Media, Talking Horse, Witbox and Animationsfabrik, the plot concerns Princess Emmy who possesses the magical power of talking to her pet horses.

English voice cast 
Ruby Barnhill as Princess Emmy
Bella Ramsey as Princess Gizana
John Hannah as King Earl
Franka Potente as Queen Karla
Joel Fry as Caesar

Release and reception 
Released in Germany in 2019, Princess Emmy was met with generally average to negative reviews from critics. The film was released in the UK on 23 August 2019. Outside of Germany, the film grossed $54,328.

References

External links 

Princess Emmy at filmportal.de (in German)

2019 films
2019 computer-animated films
2019 fantasy films
German children's fantasy films
German fantasy adventure films
2010s children's fantasy films
2010s children's animated films
Belgian animated films
2010s German-language films
Animated films about animals
Animated feature films
British animated fantasy films
British children's animated films
British children's fantasy films
British computer-animated films
2010s English-language films
2010s British films
2010s German films